Bypass to Happiness is a 1934 British romantic comedy film directed by Anthony Kimmins and starring Tamara Desni, Maurice Evans and Kay Hammond. It was shot at Shepperton Studios near London and distributed by Fox Film.

Cast
Tamara Desni as Tamara
 Maurice Evans as 	Robin
 Kay Hammond as 	Dinah
 Mark Daly as 	Wallop
 Eliot Makeham as 	Miller
 Nellie Bowman as Jane
 John Teed as 	Stephen
 Billy Holland as Jim

References

Bibliography
 Low, Rachael. Filmmaking in 1930s Britain. George Allen & Unwin, 1985.
 Wood, Linda. British Films, 1927-1939. British Film Institute, 1986.

External links
Bypass to Happiness at IMDb

1934 films
British romantic comedy films
1930s British films
1934 romantic comedy films
1930s English-language films
Films directed by Anthony Kimmins
Films shot at Shepperton Studios
Fox Film films